Denise Dy and Treat Huey were the defending champions having won the event in 2015, but Huey chose not to participate
 

Nicha Lertpitaksinchai and Sanchai Ratiwatana won the gold medal, defeating Jessy Rompies and Christopher Rungkat in the final, 6–1, 6–2.

Peangtarn Plipuech and Sonchat Ratiwatana, and Dy and Ruben Gonzales won the bronze medals.

Medalists

Seeds

Draw

External links
 Draw

Mixed Doubles